is a Japanese politician of the Democratic Party of Japan, formerly a member of the House of Councillors in the Diet (national legislature). A native of Hubei, China and dropout of Chuo University, he was elected to the House of Councillors for the first time in 1998 after serving in the assembly of the House of Representatives for four terms since 1983.

References

External links 
  in Japanese.

Members of the House of Councillors (Japan)
1942 births
Living people
Democratic Party of Japan politicians